The Confédération des syndicats nationaux (CSN; Confederation of National Trade Unions) is the second largest trade union federation in Quebec by membership.

History 
It was founded in Hull in 1921 as the Confédération des travailleurs catholiques du Canada (Catholic Workers Confederation of Canada). It became the CSN only in 1960 when it became secular. The CSN developed a close relationship with the Quebec Liberal Party and worked together to reform Québec's labor law in 1965 to extend collective bargaining to government employees. However, by the late 1960s the CSN had fallen out of favor with the provincial government as it became radicalized and threw its support behind social movements.

In 1971, the three leading Quebec unions, the CSN, the CEQ teacher's union, and the Québec Federation of Labour (FTQ) voted to form the Common Front, a syndicalist organization demanding a unified minimum wage for their 250,000 members. When negotiations failed between the Common Front and the Liberal government, the unions launched the largest general strike in Canadian history. When the strike's leaders were jailed for defying orders to return to work, the strike lost momentum and the Common Front broke apart.

The CSN first formally supported Quebec sovereignty in May 1990. It had, however, been associated with the sovereignty movement long before. In both the 1973 and 1976 provincial elections, the CSN, without formally endorsing the Parti québécois, let it be known that it considered the PQ to be most closely aligned with workers' interests. During the 1980 Quebec referendum, the CSN supported a yes vote on "sovereignty-association".

Structure 
The CSN is characterized by decentralized administration: local unions are organized into federations by sector of activity and regional councils, and are very independent from the central organization. It is also the most politically active trade union in Quebec.

The Confederation currently has about 300,000 members, distributed evenly between men and women, and between the private and public sectors. Marc Laviolette was replaced as president in 2002 by Claudette Carbonneau. Louis Roy, Roger Valois, and Denise Boucher are the 1st, 2nd and 3rd vice-presidents, respectively. Lise Poulin is the secretary and Pierre Patry is the treasurer.

The Montreal Central Council of the CSN endorsed Québec solidaire for the 2007 Quebec election.

Presidents 
Pierre Beaulé (1921–1933)
Osias Filion (1933)
René Bénard (1934)
Alfred Charpentier (1935–1946)
Gérard Picard (1946–1958)
Roger Mathieu (1958–1960)
Jean Marchand (1961–1964)
Marcel Pepin (1965–1976)
Norbert Rodrigue (1976–1982)
Donatien Corriveau (1982–83)
Gérald Larose (1983–1999)
Marc Laviolette (1999–2002)
Claudette Carbonneau (2002–2011)
Louis Roy (2011–2012)
Jacques Létourneau (2012–2021)
Caroline Senneville (2021–present)

See also
Centrale des syndicats démocratiques (CSD)
Centrale des syndicats du Québec (CSQ)
Fédération des travailleurs du Québec (FTQ)
List of trade unions in Quebec
List of trade unions in Canada

References

Sources

External links

Official website of the CSN (mostly in French)
Confédération des syndicats nationaux – Web Archive created by the University of Toronto Libraries

Trade unions in Quebec
Confédération des syndicats nationaux
Organizations based in Montreal
Trade unions established in 1921
Provincial federations of labour (Canada)
1921 establishments in Quebec
Catholic trade unions